Something Up My Sleeve is the fifth studio album by the American country music singer-songwriter Suzy Bogguss, released in 1993 on Liberty Records. Something Up My Sleeve produced two Top 10 singles: "Just Like the Weather" and "Hey Cinderella", which Bogguss co-wrote with Grammy-nominated songwriters Matraca Berg and Gary Harrison. Two other singles, "You Wouldn't Say That to a Stranger" and "Souvenirs", both failed to reach the top 40.

The album was originally titled Diamonds and Tears.

The UK release included the bonus track "Take It to the Limit," which Bogguss recorded for the Eagles tribute album, Common Thread: The Songs of the Eagles.

Critical reception

Bryan Buss of AllMusic wrote that the album is "one of Suzy Bogguss' finest and most consistent albums."

Track listing

Personnel
Suzy Bogguss - lead vocals, background vocals
Billy Dean - vocals on "Something Up My Sleeve"
Matt Rollings - keyboards
Dan Dugmore - pedal steel guitar, steelpan
Brent Rowan - electric guitar, acoustic guitar
Johnny Neel - Hammond organ
Leland Sklar - bass guitar
Eddie Bayers - drums
Pat Bergesson, Darrell Scott - electric guitar
Tom Roady - percussion
Terry McMillan - harmonica
Ted Hewitt, Matraca Berg, Gerald Boyd, Harry Stinson, Suzi Ragsdale, Gerald Alan Boyd, Beth Nielsen Chapman, Martina McBride - background vocals

Production
Producer: Jimmy Bowen, Suzy Bogguss
Engineer: John Guess, Marty Williams, Gabe Veltry
Assistant Engineer: Ken Hutton, Marty Williams, Derek Bason
Vocal Engineer: Marty Williams
String Engineer: Gabe Veltry
Mixing: John Guess
Digital Editing, Mastering: Glenn Meadows
Conductor, String Arrangements: David Campbell
Concert Master: Sid Page
Creative Director: Sherri Halford
Art Direction: Virginia Team
Design: Jerry Joyner
Photography: Randee Saint Nicholas
Hair Stylist, Make-Up: Eric Barnard
Distributor: EMI Music Dist.
Studio: Emerald Sound Studio, Nashville, TN.

Chart performance

Album

Singles

Certifications
RIAA Certification

Release details

References

1993 albums
Suzy Bogguss albums
Liberty Records albums
Albums produced by Jimmy Bowen